San Esteban Island (Seri: Coftéecöl  and sometimes Hast ) is a small island in the Gulf of California, Mexico, located to the southwest of Tiburón Island. It is part of the Municipality of Hermosillo in Sonora and has a land area of 39.773 km2 (15.356 sq mi), the 15th-largest island in Mexico. It is located in the Gulf of California. It was once inhabited by a group of the Seri people.

San Esteban Island is home to many types of rare animal species found on only a few of the islands, such as the San Esteban chuckwalla (Sauromalus varius), the spiny chuckwalla (S. hispidus) and the spiny-tailed iguana (Ctenosaura conspicuosa).

References

Further reading

 (in Spanish).

External links
Land area of islands in Mexico INEGI

Islands of Sonora
Hermosillo
Islands of the Gulf of California
Uninhabited islands of Mexico